The 1991 World Juniors Track Cycling Championships were the 17th annual Junior World Championships for track cycling held in Colorado Springs, United States in August 1991.

The Championships had five events for men (Sprint, Points race, Individual pursuit, Team pursuit and 1 kilometre time trial) and two for women (Individual pursuit and Sprint).

Events

Medal table

References

UCI Juniors Track World Championships
1991 in track cycling
1991 in American sports